Loko  is a town in Nasarawa Local Government Area of Nasarawa State in the middle belt region or North central zone of Nigeria.It is found along the River Benue bank.
The town is a mini-port, along the river benue, for the conveyance of export materials, to the eastern and western parts of Nigeria.

People 
The main ethnic groups and the inhabitants of Loko town, are the Bassa, Agatu, Igbira, Afo. Others are Nupe, Hausa and Kanuri.

Commercial Activities 
The main activities engaged by the inhabitants of Loko town are farming and fishing.

References 

Populated places in Nasarawa State